Giulio Alberoni (30 May 1664 OS – 26 June NS 1752) was an Italian cardinal and
statesman in the service of Philip V of Spain.

Early years
He was born near Piacenza, probably at the village of Fiorenzuola d'Arda in the Duchy of Parma.

His father was a gardener, and he himself became first connected with the church in the humble position of a bellringer and verger in the Duomo of Piacenza; he was twenty-one when the judge Ignazio Gardini, of Ravenna, was banished, and he followed Gardini to Ravenna, where he met the vice-legate Giorgio Barni, who was made bishop of Piacenza in 1688 and appointed Alberoni chamberlain of his household. Alberoni took priest's orders, and afterwards accompanied the son of his patron to Rome.

During the War of the Spanish Succession Alberoni laid the foundation of his political success by the services he rendered to Louis-Joseph, duc de Vendôme, commander of the French forces in Italy, to whom the duke of Parma had sent him. That a low-ranking priest was used as envoy was due to the duke's rude manners: the previous envoy, the bishop of Parma, had quit because the duke had wiped his buttocks in front of him: Saint-Simon in his Mémoires relates that Alberoni gained Vendôme's favor when he was received in the same way, but reacted adroitly by kissing the duke's buttocks and crying "O culo di angelo!". The duke was amused, and this joke started Alberoni's brilliant career. When the French forces were recalled in 1706, he accompanied the duke to Paris, where he was favourably received by Louis XIV.

Middle years

Alberoni accompanied Vendôme to Spain as his secretary and became very active in promoting the cause of the French candidate Philip V. Following Vendôme's death, in 1713 he was made a Count and appointed Consular agent for Parma at Philip's court where he was a Royal favourite.

Under the terms of the 1713 Treaty of Utrecht, Philip became King of Spain but the Spanish Empire was effectively partitioned. The Southern Netherlands and their Italian possessions were ceded to the Austrian Habsburgs and Savoy, Menorca and Gibraltar went to Britain while British merchants gained trading rights in the previously closed market of the Spanish Americas.

At this time, the key powerbroker at the Spanish court was Marie-Anne de la Trémoille, princesse des Ursins who dominated Phillip and his wife Maria Luisa of Savoy. Alberoni worked with her and when Maria Luisa died in 1714 they arranged for Philip to marry Elisabetta Farnese, daughter of the Duke of Parma.

Elisabetta was a strong personality herself and formed an alliance with Alberoni, their first action being to banish the Princesse des Ursins. By the end of 1715, Alberoni had been made a Duke and Grandee of Spain, a member of the King's council, Bishop of Málaga and Chief Minister of the Hispanic Monarchy. In July 1717, Pope Clement XI appointed him Cardinal, allegedly because of his assistance in resolving several ecclesiastical disputes between Rome and Madrid in favour of Rome.

One outcome of the war was to reduce the powers of Castile and Aragon and create a Spanish state similar to the centralised French system. This allowed Alberoni to copy the economic reforms of Colbert and he passed a series of decrees aimed at restoring the Spanish economy. These abolished internal custom-houses, promoted trade with the Americas, instituted a regular mail service to the colonies and reorganised state finances along lines established by the French economist Jean Orry. Some attempts were made to satisfy Spanish conservatives e.g. a new School of Navigation was reserved for the sons of the nobility.

These reforms made Spain confident enough to attempt the recovery of territories in Italy ceded to Savoy and Charles VI of Austria. In 1717, a Spanish force occupied Sardinia unopposed; neither Austria or Savoy had significant naval forces and Austria was engaged in the Austro-Turkish War of 1716–18. This assumed the British would not intervene but when 38,000 Spanish troops landed on Sicily in 1718, Britain declared it a violation of Utrecht. On 2 August 1718, Britain, France, the Netherlands and the Austrians formed the Quadruple Alliance and on 11 August the Royal Navy destroyed a Spanish fleet off Sicily at the Battle of Cape Passaro.

Alberoni now attempted to offset British in the Mediterranean by sponsoring a Jacobite landing to divert their naval resources; he also sought to end the 1716 Anglo-French Alliance by using the Cellamare conspiracy to replace the current French Regent the Duke of Orleans with Phillip of Spain. However, he failed to appreciate that Britain was now powerful enough to maintain naval superiority in the Mediterranean and the Atlantic while France declared war on Spain in December 1718 on discovery of the Conspiracy.

France invaded eastern Spain and in October 1719 a British naval expedition captured the Spanish port of Vigo; they landed 6,000 troops, held Vigo for ten days, destroyed vast quantities of stores and equipment and then re-embarked unopposed. The nearby city of Santiago de Compostela even paid £40,000 in return for being left alone. As intended, this was a crushing demonstration of British naval power and showed the Spanish Britain could land anywhere along their coastline and leave when they wanted to. The failure of his policy meant Alberoni was dismissed on 5 December 1719 and ordered to leave Spain, with the Treaty of The Hague in 1720 confirming the outcome of Utrecht.

Later years

He went to Italy, escaped from arrest at Genoa, and had to take refuge among the Apennines, Pope Clement XI, who was his bitter enemy, having given strict orders for his arrest. On the death of Clement in 1721, Alberoni boldly appeared at the conclave, and took part in the election of Innocent XIII, after which he was for a short time imprisoned by the new pontiff on the demand of Spain on charges including sodomy (Elizabeth Charlotte of the Palatine noted in her diaries that he was a pederast). He was ultimately cleared by a commission of his fellow Cardinals. At the next election (1724) he was himself proposed for the papal chair, and secured ten votes at the conclave that elected Benedict XIII.

Benedict's successor, Clement XII (elected 1730), named him legate of Ravenna, where he erected the Porta Alberoni (1739), a magnificent gateway that formerly provided access to the city's dockyards, and has since been moved to the entrance of the Teatro Rasi. That same year, the strong and unwarrantable measures he adopted to subject the grand republic of San Marino to the papal states incurred the pope's displeasure, and left a historical scar in that place's memory. He was soon replaced by another legate in 1740, and he retired to Piacenza, where in 1730 Clement XII appointed him administrator of the hospital of San Lazzaro, a medieval foundation for the benefit of lepers. Since leprosy had nearly disappeared in Italy, Alberoni obtained the consent of the pope to suppress the hospital, which had fallen into great disorder, and replaced it with a seminary for the priestly education of seventy poor boys, under the name of the Collegio Alberoni, which it still bears. The Cardinal's collections of art gathered in Rome and Piacenza, housed in his richly appointed private apartments, have been augmented by the Collegio. There are remarkable suites of Flemish tapestries, and paintings, among which the most famous is the Ecce Homo by Antonello da Messina (1473), but which also include panels by Jan Provoost and other Flemish artists, oil paintings by Domenico Maria Viani and Francesco Solimena.

Alberoni was a gourmand. Interspersed in his official correspondence with Parma are requests for local delicacies triffole (truffles), salame, robiola cheeses, and agnolini (kind of pasta). The pork dish "Coppa del Cardinale", a specialty of Piacenza, is named for him. A "timballo Alberoni" combines maccaroni, shrimp sauce, mushrooms, butter and cheese.

Death and legacy
He died leaving a sum of 600,000 ducats to endow the seminary he had founded. He left the rest of the immense wealth he had acquired in Spain to his nephew. Alberoni produced many manuscripts. The genuineness of the Political Testament, published in his name at Lausanne in 1753, has been questioned.

References and sources
References

Sources
 
 Kuethe, Allan J. "Cardinal Alberoni and Reform in the American Empire." in Francisco A. Eissa-Barroso y Ainara Vázquez Varela, eds. Early Bourbon Spanish America. Politics and Society in a forgotten Era (1700–1759) (Brill, 2013): 23–38.

 Catholic Encyclopedia: Giulio Alberoni
 Catholic Hierarchy: Giulio Cardinal Alberoni
 Cardinals of the Holy Roman Church: Conclave of 31 March – 8 May 1724
 Collegio Alberoni, Piacenza
 The San Marino event of 1739–40

1664 births
1752 deaths
People from Fiorenzuola d'Arda
18th-century Italian cardinals
Grandees of Spain